A harmonica gun or slide gun  is a form of firearm which was breech loaded with a steel slide, containing a number of chambers bored in it and which were filled with projectiles. Most harmonica guns are percussion cap guns, although some designs exist for compressed air guns and some examples were made in pinfire cartridge form. In percussion cap guns, each chamber contains a separate primer, powder charge, and projectile. The slide was inserted in an opening in the breech action and could be advanced by releasing the camlock, moving the slide by hand. The gun comes in both pistol and rifle models, as well as single-action and double-action.

The earliest example of a harmonica gun is probably the one constructed by the Swiss inventor Welten in 1742.

According to Clive Scott Chisholm in Following the Wrong God Home: Footloose in an American Dream and Louis A Garavaglia & Charles G. Worman in Firearms of the American West: 1803-1865 the slide gun was independently invented by a Mormon gunsmith called Nicanor Kendall in 1838 and it was from this gunsmith that Browning got the idea for his own harmonica guns when he moved to the area in which Kendall was living in around 1840.

The most famous maker of harmonica guns was Jonathan Browning, father of John Moses Browning. Commencing in 1834 in Quincy, Illinois, he began to make harmonica guns and more conventional revolving rifles. He continued to improve on the principle after he became a member of the Church of Jesus Christ of Latter-day Saints and emigrated to Nauvoo, Illinois, and finally Ogden, Utah.

In 1837 a percussion cap harmonica gun was patented by Elijah Fisher and Dexter H. Chamberlain.

In 1854 a pump action harmonica gun was patented by Alexander Bain.

A crank-operated harmonica gun was patented in 1856 by C G Terrel.

See also
Muzzleloader

References

External links

Jonathan Browning, Mormon gunsmith (Nov 6 2008) 
More Pictures of a Harmonica Gun
Example of a Harmonica Rifle

Firearm actions